Right Reverend Justin Bernard Gnanapragasam (born 13 May 1948) is a Sri Lanka Tamil priest and the current Roman Catholic Bishop of Jaffna.

Early life
Gnanapragasam was born on 13 May 1948 in Karampon on the island of Velanaitivu in northern Ceylon. As a young boy serving as an altar boy at St Mary's Church, Kayts, that he showed signs of his vocation to become a priest. 

At the age of ten he conveyed his desire to his family that his ambition is to become a priest of a God and begged them continually to send him to the seminary. The parents took Justin to late Bishop Rt. Rev. Dr. Emilianspillai and requested his admission to the seminary. He had his primary education at St Anthony's College, Kayts.  Bishop Emilanasapillai permitted him to be admitted at the seminary and Justin entered St Martin's Minor Seminary Jaffna in 1959 and continued his secondary education at St Patrick's College, Jaffna and gained admission to the National Seminary in Kandy. After completing his studies in Philosophy at the National seminary in Kandy, he then entered to Papal Seminary in Pune and studied theology from 1972 to 1974.

Career
Gnanapragasam was ordained as a priest in April 1974. He then held various positions: assistant priest in Kilinochchi and Valaipadu (1974–75); assistant parish priest in Uruthirapuram (1975–76); and assistant priest in Ilavalai (1976–79). Between 1979 and 1980 he studied ecumenical theology at the University of Hull. On returning to Sri Lanka he served as parish priest in Mareesankoodal and vice-rector of St. Henry’s College, Ilavalai (1980–85). He was a lecturer at the University of Jaffna's Department of Christian Civilization from 1982 to 1984.

Gnanapragasam then returned to the UK to study education science in Southampton between 1986 and 1989. He was then director of a group of state schools and rector of St. Henry’s College, Ilavalai (1990–94); dean of the Ilavalai Deanery (1995-02); visiting professor at the major seminary in Jaffna (1992-06); and rector of St. Patrick's College, Jaffna (2002–07).

Rt.Rev.Dr. Justin Gnananpragsam is a scholar with litany academic qualifications specialized in the field of education had been the rector of reputed Colleges in the North, St, Henry's College, Illavalai and St.Patrick's College, Jaffna. During his remarkable period many students excelled in studies and sports and entered university an won soccer Champion trophies.  He was a lecturer in Philosophy of Education at St.Francis Major Seminary, Jaffna. 

Msgr Justin is a gracious Priest of virtue and wisdom and a man of principle and discipline with sound character and charisma. A unique preacher of the word of God and cherishes the wonderful gift of God. He is a pastor with a loving heart for the marginalized oppressed destitute and source of inspiration for many and many approach him for guidance and advice. He is much recognized and respected by the erudite and Government hierarchy in the North and South. He played and important role during the ethnic disturbances to eliminate mistrust between two communities and establish peace and harmony in the country. Rev.Dr.Justin Gnananapragasam is an outspoken clergyman who always stood justice and equality and championed the rights of the people irrespective of religion or race. Even non Christians admired his  noble quality and generosity and respect him and accept him as their deliver at adversities.

Gnanapragasam became an examiner of doctoral thesis at University of Jaffna in 2002, vicar general of the Jaffna Diocese in 2007 and director of the diocesan press in 2008. He was a member of the University of Jaffna's senate from 1998 to 2014. On October 13th 2015, Pope Francis appointed him as a Bishop of Jaffna.

Homily and Speeches deliverd as a Bishop 
As a Bishop of Jaffna he continuously requested Sri Lankan Tamil Parliamentarians to work together to bring political solution for the Tamil People in the country.  

In his homily he often said that abortion is a sin as it kill one soul. 

Though he is a Bishop he openly told that some priest are not faithful to the Church and Mission, though they justify their unfaithfulness with so many reasons their justification cannot be accepted.    

On 28th of August 2022, in a speech made at Sillalai he pointed out that " Family life is more difficult compared to priestly life" He also commented that the faith of the people sustain Priest.

References

1948 births
Academic staff of the University of Jaffna
Alumni of St. Patrick's College, Jaffna
Roman Catholic bishops of Jaffna
Living people
People from Northern Province, Sri Lanka
Sri Lankan Tamil academics
Sri Lankan Tamil priests